Kawałek Kulki (abbreviated as KAQ).
– a Polish band formed in 2001 in Gorzów Wielkopolski.  Their music is described as a combination of rock and sung poetry and classified as alternative rock.
Their first studio album, preceded by three EPs, was released in November 2007. The second album, entitled Noc poza domem/error, was released in April 2010.

History 
The members themselves do not know what the name of the band originated from. Błażej Król says:
“To be honest, I myself have no idea where the name Kawałek Kulki comes from. It was born spontaneously, as a result of brainstorming. Everyone can now make up their own story.”

2001-2005: The beginning 
The band was formed in 2001 in Wieprzyce, one of the districts of Gorzów Wielkopolski, where Paweł Turłaj, Magdalena’s brother, played along with the guitarist Błażej Król.  In 2002 and 2003 the band won the music contest organized by City Cultural Centre in Gorzów Wielkopolski.  It was also in 2003 that their first EP, Wybucha Bomba, was released.

In 2004 Kawałek Kulki won both audience and best lyrics prize at Rock Festival in Gorzów Wielkopolski.  Soon after, they made their debut on Radio Zachód with a song Kolegi tata jest policjantem, featured on the second EP Wyprawa w poszukiwaniu raf koralowych rzeki Warty z Kawałkiem Kulki w kieszeni, released in autumn 2004.  In 2005 another EP, entitled Radio Wieprzyce, was released.

2007–present: Kawałek Kulki
In January 2007 the band performed in their hometown during a local finale of Wielka Orkiestra Świątecznej Pomocy (The Great Orchestra of Christmas Charity). In March Błażej Król received a music scholarship from the mayor of Gorzów Wielkopolski. Their debut longplay album Kawałek kulki was released on November 9, 2007 by Luna Music . The album, which consisted of 14 songs, received a generally favourable critical reaction.

At the same time the band was accused of monotony.

On the 5th of November the band performed in S-1 concert studio of Szczecin Polish Radio, presenting the material from their new album. In August 2008 Kawałek Kulki played on the forest stage during the 1st day of OFF Festival held in Mysłowice.

In July 2009 a song Bajka, created on the basis of Tadeusz Gajcy’s poem, was included in the album Gajcy which was released to honour the 65th anniversary of the poet’s death. Apart from Kawałek Kulki, on the album appeared other artists, including Kazik Staszewski, Pogodno, Maleo Reggae Rockers, Pustki, Dezerter and Lech Janerka. Moreover, most of the musicians performed on the 25th of July in Wolności Park in the Warsaw Uprising Museum during a concert promoting the material from this album.

Members

Current members 
 Magdalena Turłaj – violin, vocal
 Błażej Król – electric guitar, vocal
 Maciej Parada – bass guitar
 Jacek Szmytkowski – drums

Former members 
 Paweł Turłaj – drums
 Bartosz “Niedźwiedź” Matuszewski – drums
 Karol Wiśniewski – drums
 Jacek Dębicki – drums
 Piotr Kozaryn – bass gitar

Discography 
 Wybucha Bomba (EP, 2003)
 Wyprawa w poszukiwaniu raf koralowych rzeki Warty z Kawałkiem Kulki w kieszeni (EP, 2004)
 Radio Wieprzyce (EP, 2005)
 Kawałek Kulki (2007)
 Noc poza domem/error (2010)

Other albums featuring Kawałek Kulki 
 Nadzieja Lubuskiej Sceny 2004 (Radio Zachód, 2004)
 Trzymaj z Nami cz.2 (Polskie Radio S.A., 2006)
 Radio Lampa 4 (Lampa, 2006)
 Gajcy (Muzeum Powstania Warszawskiego, 2009)

References

Polish alternative rock groups